John F. Ewart Farm is a historic home, farm, and national historic district located near Huntersville, Mecklenburg County, North Carolina. The district encompasses five contributing buildings and one contributing site in rural Mecklenburg County.  The farmhouse was built in 1898, and is a two-story, three-bay, vernacular I-house with a rear kitchen ell.  It has a triple-A roof and two exterior, brick end chimneys. It features a pedimented gable front porch. Other contributing resources include a dairy and well canopy (c. 1898), a smokehouse (c. 1898), barn (c. 1898), barn (c. 1939), and the agricultural landscape.

It was added to the National Register of Historic Places in 1991.

References

Farms on the National Register of Historic Places in North Carolina
Houses on the National Register of Historic Places in North Carolina
Historic districts on the National Register of Historic Places in North Carolina
Houses completed in 1898
Houses in Mecklenburg County, North Carolina
National Register of Historic Places in Mecklenburg County, North Carolina